Ondino Sant'Anna (Niterói, August 9, 1940 — Rio de Janeiro City, December 26, 2010)  known  artistically  as Dino Santana, was a Brazilian actor and brother of the famous comedian Dedé Santana. He is most known for his role of supporting character in the Brazilian comedic series Os Trapalhões and some of its films. He suffered from prostate cancer and died in 2010.

Television
1965: Maloca e Bonitão (TV Tupi) - Bonitão
1974-1976: Os Trapalhões (TV Tupi)
1978-1993: Os Trapalhões (Rede Globo)
2004-2008: Dedé e o Comando Maluco (SBT) - Português

Cinema
1969: Deu uma Louca no Cangaço
1969: 2000 Anos de Confusão - Bonitao
1970: A Ilha dos Paqueras - Commander Dino
1970: Se Meu Dólar Falasse
1972: Os Desempregados
1975: Zé Sexy...Louco, Muito Louco Por Mulher
1976: O Mulherengo
1979: O Rei e Os Trapalhões - Guarda Real
1979: O Cinderelo Trapalhão
1979: Eu Matei Lúcio Flávio
1983: Atrapalhando a Suate
1984: Os Trapalhões e o Mágico de Oróz (O Beato do deserto)
1984: A Filha dos Trapalhões - González
1986: Os Trapalhões e o Rei do Futebol - Reporter (uncredited)
1987: Os Fantasmas Trapalhões - (final film role)

References

External links
 
 circus artist Dino Santana

1940 births
2010 deaths
Brazilian male film actors
Brazilian male comedians
Os Trapalhões
People from Niterói